Rosangelica is a Venezuelan telenovela written by Alicia Barrios and produced by Venevisión. The telenovela is a free adaptation of María Teresa written by Delia Fiallo.

Sonya Smith and Víctor Cámara star as the main protagonists with Lupita Ferrer as the main antagonist.

Plot
This is the story of Rosangelica and Oscar Eduardo whose love will be affected by secrets from the past. Twenty years ago, Rodolfo raped Gisele, his secretary. Out of fury over the incident, her husband Alberto murders Rodolfo. However, Gisele takes the blame for her husband's crime. Out of distress over the situation, she becomes mentally ill and is confined in a mental asylum. As a result of the rape, Gisele gives birth to Rosangelica.

Rosangelica grows up into a beautiful woman full of life and a talented artist. She meets Oscar Eduardo, a handsome doctor who later abandons her after discovering about her past. Just like her mother, Rosangelica is left pregnant and confined to an asylum for mental patients. Through a series of events, one of them involving a fire in the asylum, Rosangelica is presumed to be dead. However, she meets Joel, a fashion photographer who transforms her into a sensational model called Lorena Paris. As time passes by, Rosangelica will regain the memories she lost and find a second chance at love with Oscar Eduardo.

Cast

 Víctor Cámara as Oscar Eduardo Gel de la Rosa / Argenis
 Sonya Smith as Rosangélica González Hernández / Elisa Montero
 Lupita Ferrer as  Cecilia Gel de la Rosa 
 Daniel Alvarado as Joel Cruz
 Dalila Colombo as Gisela#1
 Belén Díaz as Ligia
 Orángel Defín as Marcos González
 Hilda Blanco as Luz
 Eva Mondolfi as Verónica Hernández de González
 Angel Acosta as Roberto de la Rosa
 Omar Moinello as Leonardo Santaevo
 Nancy González as Gisela#2
 Denise Novell as Mariana González Hernández 
 Eduardo Bástidas as René González Hernández
 Mónica Rubio as Martha González Hernández
 Ana Martínez as Esther de Santaevo
 Jimmy Verdum as Mocambo 
 Fedra López as Marielba
 Víctor Cuica
 Ana Massimo as Rita
 Lotario as Arcadio
 Patricia Oliveros
 Regino Jiménez
 Lucy Mendoza
 Julio Berna as Juan
 Zoe Bolívar as Cinthia
 Luis Malave
 Delia López
 Yadira Casanova
 Diego Acuña
 Carolina Muzziotti as Jennifer
 Grecia Reyes as Lucero de la Rosa Hernández
 Diego Arellano Barrios as Oscar Eduardo de la Rosa
 Ayari Reyes
 Wanda D'Isidoro as Ana Elisa
 Manuel Sainz
 Elizabeth López
 Oscar Urdaneta
 Esperanza Acosta
 Joel de la Rosa
 Elba Rosa Hidaldo
 Humberto Tancredi jr.
 Henry Contreras
 María E. Barrios
 Sol Mary Liendo
 Denisse Hurtado
 Milagros Martín
 Anaís Mujíca
 Mauricio Márquez
 Rina Hernández
 Kelly Hernández
 Benigno Sanchez
 Orlando Noguera
 Francisco del Castillo
 Ramón Piñango
 Muratti Gahu
 Gabriela Spanic as Carla
 Carolina Tejera
 Hans Christopher as Luis Gerardo Cheysme

References

External links

Rosangelica on telenovelas.hu

1993 telenovelas
Venevisión telenovelas
Venezuelan telenovelas
1993 Venezuelan television series debuts
1993 Venezuelan television series endings
Spanish-language telenovelas
Television shows set in Venezuela